Podino is a village in the municipality of Mogila, North Macedonia.

Demographics
Podino is attested in the Ottoman defter of 1467/68 as a village in the vilayet of Manastir. The overwhelming majority of the inhabitants attested bore typical Slavic anthroponyms, with one instance of a individual bearing the name Miho Arbanaš, Arbanas being a medieval Slavic rendering for Albanian.

According to the 2002 census, the village had a total of 51 inhabitants. Ethnic groups in the village include:

Macedonians 48
Romani 3

References

Villages in Mogila Municipality